Corinth is the successor to an ancient city, and is a former municipality in Corinthia, Peloponnese, which is located in south-central Greece. Since the 2011 local government reform, it has been part of the municipality of Corinth, of which it is the seat and a municipal unit. It is the capital of Corinthia.

It was founded as Nea Korinthos, or New Corinth, in 1858 after an earthquake destroyed the existing settlement of Corinth, which had developed in and around the site of ancient Corinth.

Geography
Natural features around the city include the narrow coastal plain of Vocha, the Corinthian Gulf, the Isthmus of Corinth cut by its canal, the Saronic Gulf, the Oneia Mountains, and the monolithic rock of Acrocorinth, where the medieval acropolis was built.

History 

Corinth derives its name from Ancient Corinth, a city-state of antiquity. The site was occupied from before 3000 BC.

Ancient Greece 
Historical references begin with the early 8th century BC, when Corinth began to develop as a commercial center. Between the 8th and 7th centuries, the Bacchiad family ruled Corinth. Cypselus overthrew the Bacchiad family, and between 657 and 550 BC, he and his son Periander ruled Corinth as the Tyrants.

In about 550 BC, an oligarchical government seized power. This government allied with Sparta within the Peloponnesian League, and Corinth participated in the Persian Wars and Peloponnesian War as an ally of Sparta. After Sparta's victory in the Peloponnesian war, the two allies fell out with one another, and Corinth pursued an independent policy in the various wars of the early 4th century BC. After the Macedonian conquest of Greece, the Acrocorinth was the seat of a Macedonian garrison until 243 BC, when the city was liberated and joined the Achaean League.

Ancient Rome 
Nearly a century later, in 146 BC, Corinth was captured and was completely destroyed by the Roman army.

As a newly rebuilt Roman colony in 44 BC, Corinth flourished and became the administrative capital of the Roman province of Achaea.

Modern era 
New Corinth (Nea Korinthos) was then built to the north-east of it, on the coast of the Gulf of Corinth. In 1928, a magnitude 6.3 earthquake devastated the new city, which was then rebuilt on the same site. In 1933, there was a great fire, and the new city was rebuilt again.

During the German occupation in World War II, the Germans operated a Dulag transit camp for British, Australian, New Zealander and Serbian prisoners of war and a forced labour camp in the town.

Demographics 

The Municipality of Corinth (Δήμος Κορινθίων) had a population of 58,192 according to the 2011 census, the second most populous municipality in the Peloponnese Region after Kalamata. The municipal unit of Corinth had 38,132 inhabitants, of which Corinth itself had 30,176 inhabitants, placing it in third place behind Kalamata and Tripoli among the cities of the Peloponnese Region.

The municipal unit of Corinth (Δημοτική ενότητα Κορινθίων) includes apart from Corinth proper the town of Archaia Korinthos (2,198 inhabitants in 2011), the town of Examilia (2,905 inhabitants), and the smaller settlements of Xylokeriza (1,316 inhabitants) and Solomos (817 inhabitants). The municipal unit has an area of 102.187 km2.

Economy

Industry 
Corinth is a major industrial hub at a national level. The Corinth Refinery is one of the largest oil refining industrial complexes in Europe. Ceramic tiles, copper cables, gums, gypsum, leather, marble, meat products, medical equipment, mineral water and beverages, petroleum products, and salt are produced nearby. , a period of Economic changes commenced as a large pipework complex, a textile factory and a meat packing facility diminished their operations.

Transport

Roads 
Corinth is a major road hub. The A7 toll motorway for Tripoli and Kalamata, (and Sparta via A71 toll), branches off the A8/European route E94 toll motorway from Athens at Corinth. Corinth is the main entry point to the Peloponnesian peninsula, the southernmost area of continental Greece.

Bus 
KTEL Korinthias provides intercity bus service in the peninsula and to Athens via the Isthmos station southeast of the city center. Local bus service is also available.

Railways 
The metre gauge railway from Athens and Pireaeus reached Corinth in 1884. This station closed to regular public transport in 2007. In 2005, two years prior, the city was connected to the Athens Suburban Railway, following the completion of the new Corinth railway station. The journey time from Athens to Corinth is about 55 minutes. The train station is 5 minutes by car from the city centre and parking is available for free.

Port 
The port of Corinth, located north of the city centre and close to the northwest entrance of the Corinth Canal, at 37 56.0’ N / 22 56.0’ E, serves the local needs of industry and agriculture. It is mainly a cargo exporting facility.

A new pier finished in the late 1980s doubled the capacity of the port. The reinforced mole protects anchored vessels from strong northern winds.

Within the port operates a customs office facility and a Hellenic Coast Guard post. Sea traffic is limited to trade in the export of local produce, mainly citrus fruits, grapes, marble, aggregates and some domestic imports. The port operates as a contingency facility for general cargo ships, bulk carriers and ROROs, in case of strikes at Piraeus port.

Ferries 
There was formerly a ferry link to Catania, Sicily and Genoa in Italy.

Canal 

The builders dug the canal through the Isthmus at sea level; no locks are employed. It now has little economic importance.

The canal was mooted in classical times and an abortive effort was made to build it in the 1st century AD. Julius Caesar and Caligula both considered digging the canal but died before starting the construction. The emperor Nero was the first to attempt to construct the canal. The Roman workforce responsible for the initial digging consisted of 6,000 Jewish prisoners of war. Modern construction started in 1882, after Greece gained independence from the Ottoman Empire, but was hampered by geological and financial problems that bankrupted the original builders. It was completed in 1893, but due to the canal's narrowness, navigational problems and periodic closures to repair landslips from its steep walls, it failed to attract the level of traffic anticipated by its operators. It is now used mainly for tourist traffic.

Sport 
The city's association football team is Korinthos F.C. (Π.Α.E. Κόρινθος), established in 1999 after the merger of Pankorinthian Football Club (Παγκορινθιακός) and Corinth Football Club (Κόρινθος). During the 2006–2007 season, the team played in the Greek Fourth Division's Regional Group 7. The team went undefeated that season and it earned the top spot. This granted the team a promotion to the Gamma Ethnikí (Third Division) for the 2007–2008 season. For the 2008–2009 season, Korinthos F.C. competed in the Gamma Ethniki (Third Division) southern grouping.

Twin towns/sister cities 

Corinth is twinned with:
  Syracuse, Sicily

Notable people 

 Costas Soukoulis (1951–), Professor of Physics at Iowa State University
 George Kollias (1977–), drummer for US technical death metal band Nile.
 Ioannis Papadiamantopoulos (1766–1826), revolutionary leader during the Greek War of Independence.
 Georgios Leonardopoulos, army officer
 Irene Papas, Greek actress
 Macarius (1731–1805), Metropolitan bishop of Corinth
 Anastasios Bakasetas (1993–), Greek footballer
 Evangelos Ikonomou (1987–), Greek footballer
 Panagiotis Tzanavaras (1964–), Greek footballer and football manager
 Nikolaos Zafeiriou (1871–1947), Greek artillery officer
 Konstantinos Triantafyllopoulos (1993–) Greek footballer
 Panagis Tsaldaris (1868–1936), Greek politician and prime minister of Greece

Other locations named after Corinth 

Due to its ancient history and the presence of St. Paul the Apostle in Corinth some locations all over the world have been named Corinth.

Gallery

See also 
 Corinth Canal
 Corinth Excavations
 List of traditional Greek place names

References

External links 

 City of Corinth official website 
 Kórinthos FC official website 

 
Mediterranean port cities and towns in Greece
Populated places in Corinthia
Ports and harbours of Greece
Populated coastal places in Greece
Populated places established in 1858
1858 establishments in Greece
New Testament cities